Bjørn Lothe (31 March 1952 – 30 April 2009) was a Norwegian politician for the Socialist Left Party.

He served as a deputy representative to the Parliament of Norway from Hordaland during the terms 1997–2001, 2001–2005 and 2005–2009. In total he met during 28 days of parliamentary session.

References

1952 births
2009 deaths
Deputy members of the Storting
Socialist Left Party (Norway) politicians
Hordaland politicians